Vladimirovka is a village in the Oghuz Rayon of Azerbaijan. The village forms part of the municipality of Astraxanovka.

References 

Populated places in Oghuz District